Father Henry Carr Catholic Secondary School (also referred to as Father Henry Carr, Henry Carr, FHC, FHCCSS, or Carr) is a Catholic high school  in Toronto, Ontario, Canada. It is administered by the Toronto Catholic District School Board, formerly the Metropolitan Separate School Board. It is named after a Basilian father and founder of the Pontifical Institute of Medieval Studies, Henry Carr (1880–1963).

The school was founded in 1974 by the Basilian Fathers and the MSSB as a semi-private school, though the current school building was originally opened in 1966 as Humbergrove Secondary School by the Etobicoke Board of Education when the board merged into the Toronto District School Board in which the school property is leased to the MSSB/TCDSB since 1988. The Humbergrove school was renamed to Marian Academy in 1988 and closed in 2002, though Carr occupied the property since 2007.

Carr offers the Advanced Placement (AP) academic program and is known for its elite basketball team. The motto of the school is Domine ut Videam, which translates into "Lord That I Might See".

History

Background
Henry Carr was a Basilian father also known as Father "Hank" Carr. He enhanced Catholic education in Canada by broadening the curriculum at University of Toronto's University of St. Michael’s College. He also arranged for St. Michael's to be a federated arts college. He was the co-founder of the Pontifical Institute of Medieval Studies, and an advocate for the inclusion of religious education in curricular studies.

Carr was born and raised in Oshawa, Ontario in 1880, one of nine children. He was ordained as a priest on September 3, 1905. He taught at St. Michael's College and acted as a president of the Institute of Medieval Studies until 1936 and served as the principal at St. Thomas More College in Saskatchewan. He died of pneumonia on November 28, 1963 in Vancouver, British Columbia.

History

After the opening of one of Etobicoke's first Catholic high schools, Bishop Power High School for boys in 1957 by the Basilian Fathers. At that time, pupils attended Roman Catholic schools nearby such as St. Andrew, St. Angela, St. Dorothy, or St. Jude while its graduates attended either North Albion Collegiate Institute or West Humber Collegiate Institute.

On September 3, 1974 the Basilian Fathers and the Metropolitan Separate School Board opened Father Henry Carr High School under its founding principal, Fr. Thomas Mohan C.S.B. The school building was erected in 1976 on the original 21 Panorama Court building on Kipling and Albion. The school facilities in the original building consisted of one main two-story building and 16 portables, with a cafeteria, gymnasium/auditorium and a playing field.

Throughout the school's early existence, it operated as a private school for Grades 11 to 13 only while the MSSB educated grade 9 and 10 students. This changed in 1985 when the Government of Ontario passed Bill 30 to extend funding to Roman Catholic high schools beyond grade 10 and Carr was ceased to be a private school in 1987. However, in 1988, nearby Humbergrove Secondary School, built in 1966 on Martin Grove Road, was closed and reopened by the MSSB as Marian Academy with 165 pupils. The school closed its doors in 2002 due to declining enrollment.

The school moved to the former Marian building in September 2007. The new Carr campus, at the cost of $10 million, consisted of the new main entrance, central community atrium, cafeteria, drama studio, labs, three automotive bays, new windows, stonework and landscaping. The former school building was sold to the City of Toronto in 2009 and reopened the old Panorama school building as a community hub. The renovated school was designed by Makrimichalos Cugini Architects Inc. whilst the original school building built in 1966 was designed by architect Gordon S. Adamson.

Academics and community
Father Henry Carr Catholic Secondary School is a composite co-educational school located in the area of Finch and Martin Grove in Rexdale in northwest Etobicoke. The area is a mixed residential/commercial neighbourhood with an industrial park, a Catholic elementary school (St. Dorothy), a hospital (Etobicoke General), a community college (Humber College), a park (Masseygrove), a mall (Shopper's World Albion), a public secondary school (West Humber Collegiate Institute), and two public elementary schools (Elmbanks Junior Middle Academy and Melody Village Junior School).

The school offers an Advanced Placement (AP) program. It is the regional centre for the AP and Pre-AP program for the TCDSB.

Extra-curricular activities include dramatic productions, art exhibits, drum-line and musical performances.

Other programs are
Mandatory after-school tutoring
ESL courses and supports
Vibrant Leadership groups
Chaplaincy team
Community outreach
Hospital for Sick Children Reading Program
Linkage with colleges and universities for mentorship
Cooperative Education and Apprenticeship (OYAP)
Library resource centre
A special education model
Co-host of the OYAP Carpentry Accelerated Program

Sports

FHC has the Field of Dreams, a football and track field with artificial turf field.  It offers sports such as basketball, hockey (not since 2005), football, softball, cricket, track and field, volleyball, badminton, cross-country, and swimming.

Basketball
The school is prominently known for its boys basketball program, being one of the highest ranked high schools in Toronto as a member of the Toronto District Colleges Athletic Association (TDCAA), Ontario Scholastic Basketball Association (OSBA) and Ontario Federation of School Athletic Associations (OFSAA). The FHC Crusaders founded the prep program since the 2015-16 when they captured the OFSAA "AAA" title.

Since its inception, the boys basketball program has progressed from entry-level to competitive-level to perennial powerhouse, quickly becoming the "most consistently competitive" high school boys program in the country. Many of the Crusader basketball players have joined the rosters of basketball teams at every level from NCAA Basketball to Canadian National Teams and eventually the National Basketball Association.

Throughout its existence, the FHC Crusaders had a rivalry with Eastern Commerce Saints until closing in 2015. The prep team has partnered with Air Jordan as the official supplier and sponsors of the Early Bird Classic and hosts the "Jordan Brand Players Lounge".

The Crusaders Basketball holds their home games in the Father Ted McLean Gymnasium, dedicated by then-Principal Michael Rosseitti in 2012.

Records
Ontario Champions: 2016
Ontario Finalists: 2013, 2014
Ontario Third Place: 2007, 2011
Ontario Fourth Place: 2006, 2015
TDCAA Champions: 2006–2008, 2011-2016

Notable people 

 Sim Bhullar, first person of Indian descent to play in the NBA (did not graduate)
 Dillon Brooks, basketball player (did not graduate)
 Tyler Ennis, basketball player
 Paul Higgins, ice hockey winger
 Yoana Peralta, Canadian-Dominican footballer
 Taévaunn Prince, Canadian-Jamaican basketball player (did not graduate)

See also

List of high schools in Ontario

References

External links
Father Henry Carr Catholic Secondary School

Toronto Catholic District School Board
High schools in Toronto
Education in Etobicoke
Catholic secondary schools in Ontario
Educational institutions established in 1974
Bill 30 schools
Basilian schools
Relocated schools
1974 establishments in Ontario